Eva Zeikfalvy (born 18 April 1967) is a Swedish former association football defender who won 69 caps for the Sweden women's national football team, scoring two goals. She represented Sweden at the FIFA Women's World Cup in 1991 and 1995. She is nicknamed Zäta.

Club career
Growing up in Veberöd, Zeikfalvy played football with the local Veberöds AIF girls' team until her family moved to Malmö in 1977.

Zeikfalvy left Malmö and stopped playing after the 2000 Damallsvenskan season.

International career
Zeikfalvy made her senior Sweden debut in 1988. At the 1988 FIFA Women's Invitation Tournament in Guangdong she was part of the Swedish team who finished runners-up to Norway. The Chinese press voted her into the tournament's official all-star team.

In 1991 Zeikfalvy helped Sweden to a third-place finish at the inaugural FIFA Women's World Cup. The previous year she had collected the Diamantbollen award for the best female footballer in the country.

Continued good form at club level meant Zeikfalvy was linked with a call-up to Sweden's 2000 Sydney Olympics squad. She was unable to attend due to her studies.

Personal life
Zeikfalvy is an orthopedic technician. She is of Hungarian parentage.

Since her retirement from playing, Zeikfalvy has also worked as a coach. She rejoined Malmö FF Dam as a youth team coach in December 2002. For the 2004 season she moved to Husie IF to work as an assistant to former club and Sweden team-mate Lena Videkull.

In September 2012 Zeikfalvy joined Danish Elitedivisionen club B.93/HIK/Skjold as an assistant to former Malmö team-mate Denise Reddy.

References

External links

Living people
1967 births
Swedish women's footballers
Sweden women's international footballers
1991 FIFA Women's World Cup players
1995 FIFA Women's World Cup players
Swedish people of Hungarian descent
Tyresö FF players
People from Lund Municipality
Women's association football defenders
FC Rosengård players
Sportspeople from Skåne County